Phyllota phylicoides is a species of flowering plant in the pea family (Fabaceae) found in New South Wales and Queensland. It was first described by George Bentham in 1837.

References

Mirbelioids
Plants described in 1837
Fabales of Australia
Flora of New South Wales
Flora of Queensland